Women letter writers in early modern Europe created lengthy correspondences, where they expressed their intellect and their creativity; in the process, they also left a rich historical legacy.

Over time, a large number of women's correspondences have been made the subject of publications. Some among them ignored the literary value of these missives that were sometimes circulated by their recipients. Some correspondences were, on the other hand, strictly private and their literary value—and historic value, as well—was not revealed until the rediscovery of these letters, perhaps long after the death of their authors, as in the case of Élisabeth Bégon, whose correspondence was not discovered until 1932 in the archives of the French Ministry of the Navy.

It is usually agreed that what makes these letters distinctive emanates from their spontaneity. Marie de Sévigné was the incarnation of this quality, to the point of becoming considered by many as the archetype of the woman letter writer, and an altogether literary author, even among her contemporaries, such as Suzanne Curchod: 

In 1669, the famous Letters of a Portuguese Nun appeared, presented as a translation of five letters sent by a Portuguese nun to a French officer. For a long time, these letters were accepted as authentic letters written by Mariana Alcoforado, before being definitively shown by a modern critic to be a work of literary fiction, attributed to Gabriel de Guilleragues.

Some women who wrote letters did not lead remarkable lives. For instance Nellie Weeton was born in Lancashire and she was poorly treated by her brother and husband. She copied all the letters to her brother into journals and because some of these are extant they supply an indight into life in her time.

The frontier between reality and fiction becomes blurry between literature and correspondence, above all when novelists turned this writing technique into a literary device that would become the epistolary novel, a genre that reached its peak during the Enlightenment when writers tried to persuade readers that between their hands was a real correspondence, which is what Jean-Jacques Rousseau more or less achieved with Julie, or the New Heloise.

Some famous women letter writers

 Juliette Adam
 Jeanne d'Albret
 Sophie Arnould
 Elizabeth Charlotte, Princess Palatine
 Louisa Dow Benton
 Louise Bénédicte de Bourbon
 Catherine de Bourbon
 Adélaïde de la Briche
 Cécile Bruyère
 Marie-Angélique de Coulanges
 Christine de Pisan
 Zulma Carraud
 Marquise de Caylus
 Isabelle de Charrière
 Anastasie de Circourt
 Mary Clarke
 Sophie Cottin
 Hélisenne de Crenne
 Suzanne Curchod
 Madeleine Des Roches
 Catherine Des Roches
 Marie Anne de Vichy-Chamrond, marquise du Deffand
 Louise d'Épinay
 Marie-Madeleine de La Fayette
 Marie-Thérèse Geoffrin
 Françoise de Graffigny
 Marie-Madeleine Hachard
 Anne-Catherine Helvétius
 Maria Theresa
 Sophie d'Houdetot
 Alix de Lamartine
 Ninon de Lenclos
 Amélie Lenormant
 Julie de Lespinasse
 Blandine Liszt
 Marie Anne de Mailly
 Françoise de Maintenon
 Sophie de Maraise
 Marguerite de Navarre
 Mary Montagu
 Matilda of Flanders
 Jeanne Marie Bouvier de La Mothe-Guyon
 Juliette Récamier
 Marie-Jeanne Riccoboni
 Manon Roland
 Gabrielle Roy
 Madeleine de Sablé
 Madame de Saint-Huberty
 George Sand
 Marie de Sévigné
 Marguerite de Launay, baronne de Staal
 Germaine de Staël
 Sophie Swetchine
 Claudine Guérin de Tencin
 Marie-Anne de La Trémoille
 Louise Élisabeth Vigée Le Brun
 Jane Vigor
 Sophie Volland
 Nellie Weeton (1776–1849)

References

Sources
Lettres de femmes: textes inédits et oubliés du XVIe au XVIIIe", (éd.) Elisabeth C. Goldsmith and Colette H. Winn, Paris, H. Champion, 2005, 448 p. 
 L’épistolaire au féminin : correspondances de femmes, XVIIIe au XXe, (éd.) Brigitte Diaz, Jürgen Siess, Caen, Presses universitaires de Caen, 2006 
 Marie-France Silver, Marie-Laure Girou-Swiderski, Femmes en toutes lettres : les épistolières du XVIIIe", Oxford, Voltaire Foundation, 2000 
 Josée Chomel, Philippe Chomel, Michel Cabaud, Madame de Sévigné à Grignan, une épistolière en Provence, Lyon, Aubanel, 1996 
 Lionel Duisit, Madame Du Deffand, épistolière, Genève, Droz, 1963
 Daniel Des Brosses, La Palatine : l’incorrigible épistolière aux  lettres, Paris, France, 2004 
 Rodolphe Trouilleux, N’oubliez pas Iphigénie : biographie de la cantatrice et épistolière Sophie Arnould, 1740-1802, Grenoble, Alzieu, 1999 
 Sophie Marcotte, Gabrielle Roy épistolière, Ottawa, Bibliothèque nationale du Canada, 2003 
 Catherine Blondeau, Julie de Lespinasse épistolière", 1761-1776, Lille, A.N.R.T, Université de Lille III, 1994
 Josette Chéry-Sobolewski, Madame Riccoboni épistolière, Paris, Université de Paris-Sorbonne, 1993
 Mireille Bossis, Charles. A. Porter, L’épistolarité à travers les siècles : geste de communication et/ou geste d’écriture'', Stuttgart, Franz Steiner, 1987

See also 
 Women's writing
 Nu shu
 Écriture féminine
 Epistolary novel
 Women's history

 
Letter
Baroque literature